Amatino Manucci was a merchant based in Nîmes, France, in the last 13th century, whose work includes the earliest extant accounting of double-entry bookkeeping.

Manucci kept the accounts for Giovanni Farolfi & Company, a merchant partnership based in Nîmes, France. Manucci was a partner for the Salon, South of France branch. The writing, entirely in Manucci's hand, is neat, legible, and mostly well preserved. Financial records from 1299—1300 survive that he kept for the firm's branch in Salon, Provence.  Although these records are incomplete, they show enough detail to be identified as double-entry bookkeeping. These details include the use of debits and credits and duality of entries. "No more is known of Amatino Manucci, than this ledger that he kept."

Amatino Manucci did not invent the double entry system: that was a 100-year process (perhaps a 9,000 year process). If he did not finish the process himself, it didn't occur long before, because it was clearly finished by the time he kept the books for his company.

References 

Italian accountants
13th-century Italian people
Year of birth missing
Year of death missing